Károly is a very common Hungarian male given name. It is also sometimes found as a Hungarian surname. The origin of this name is the Turkic Karul, which means hawk. Nowadays Károly is considered the equivalent of English Karl or Charles (because the Latin Carolus is very close to Károly).

Given names

 Charles I of Hungary (1288–1342), in Hungarian Károly Róbert, King of Hungary and Croatia
 Károly Aggházy (1855–1918), Hungarian piano virtuoso and composer
 Károly Andrássy (1792–1845), Hungarian politician
 Károly Bajkó (1944–1997), Hungarian Olympic wrestler
 Károly Balzsay (born 1979), Hungarian boxer 
 Károly Bartha (Minister of Defence) (1884–1964), Hungarian colonel general and politician
 Károly József Batthyány (1697–1772), Hungarian general, field marshal and ban (viceroy) of Croatia
 Károly Binder (born 1956), Hungarian jazz pianist, composer and educator
 Károly Brocky (1808–1855), Hungarian painter
 Károly Doncsecz (1918–2002), Slovene potter
 Károly Ecser (1931–2005), Hungarian weightlifter
 Károly Eperjes (born 1954), Hungarian actor
 Károly Ferencz (1913–1984), Hungarian wrestler
 Károly Ferenczy (1862–1917), Hungarian painter
 Károly Frenreisz (born 1946), Hungarian singer and songwriter
 Károly Gesztesi (1963–2020), Hungarian actor
 Károly Grósz (1930–1996), Hungarian politician
 Károly Hieronymi (1836–1911), Hungarian engineer and politician
 Károly Horvath (born 1947), Hungarian singer known as Charlie
 Károly Kárpáti (1906–1996), Hungarian Olympic wrestling
 Károly Kerkapoly (1824–1891), Hungarian politician and Minister of Finance
 Károly Kernstok (1873–1940), Hungarian painter
 Károly Kisfaludy (1788–1830), Hungarian dramatist and artist
 Károly Knezić (1808–1849), Hungarian Army general
 Károly Kós (1883–1977), Hungarian architect, writer, illustrator, ethnologist and politician
 Károly Leiningen-Westerburg (1819–1849), German general in the Hungarian Army
 Károly Lotz (1833–1904), German-Hungarian painter
 Károly Makk (1925–2017), Hungarian film director and screenwriter
 Károly Markó the Elder (1793–1860), Hungarian painter
 Károly Reich (1922–1988), Hungarian artist
 Károly Sándor (1928–2014), Hungarian footballer
 Károly Simonyi (1916–2001), Hungarian physicist, father of Charles Simonyi
 Károly Szabó (1916–1964), Austro-Hungarian assistant of Raoul Wallenberg in rescuing Hungarian Jews from the Holocaust
 Károly Takács (1910–1976), Hungarian Olympic sport shooter
 Károly Tersztyánszky (1854–1921), Austro-Hungarian general in World War I
 Károly Than (1834–1908), Hungarian chemist
 Károly Vécsey (1803–1849), Hungarian Army general
 Károly Zipernowsky (1853–1942), Autrian-born Hungarian engineer

Surnames
 David Karoly (born 1955), Australian atmospheric scientist
 Jenő Károly (1886–1926), Hungarian footballer

See also

Károlyi, a Hungarian surname
Karoli (disambiguation)
Karola
Karolj

References

Hungarian masculine given names
Hungarian-language surnames